
Gmina Sieciechów is a rural gmina (administrative district) in Kozienice County, Masovian Voivodeship, in east-central Poland.

Villages
Gmina Sieciechów contains the villages and settlements of Głusiec, Kępice, Łoje, Mozolice Duże, Mozolice Małe, Nagórnik, Nowe Słowiki, Opactwo, Sieciechów, Słowiki-Folwark, Stare Słowiki, Wola Klasztorna, Wólka Wojcieszkowska, Występ, Zajezierze and Zbyczyn.

Neighboring gminas
Gmina Sieciechów is bordered by the town of Dęblin and by the gminas of Garbatka-Letnisko, Gniewoszów, Kozienice, Puławy and Stężyca.

References
Polish official population figures 2006

Sieciechow
Kozienice County